Hawarden Rangers F.C. is a Welsh football club playing in Hawarden, Flintshire, after being founded in 1974 by Elwyn Owen.  They currently play in the Ardal NW, the third tier of the Welsh football pyramid.

The senior team were members of the North East Wales Football League Premier Division, following the restructure of the FA Wales Pyramid Structure and have previously been members of the Welsh National League (Wrexham Area) and prior to that, the Clwyd League.

The Junior sections consist of teams ranging from U6 to U19, all of which compete in the Queensferry Sports Flintshire Junior and Youth League.

History

Hawarden Rangers Football Club was formed in 1974 by Elwyn Owen.

The club's patron is the grandson of Victorian Prime Minister; Sir William Gladstone. It was he, who had the foresight to leave the Gladstone Playing Fields to the local people for future enjoyment and recreation, which is the reasoning behind the Hawarden Castle gates on the club crest.

The senior setup were founder members of the Clwyd League, which was set up to improve the level in the area whilst the junior section was created in 1984 by the amalgamation of the two local teams; Hawarden Wayfarers and Hawarden Pathfinders, respectively.

Following the amalgamation, the club became Hawarden United before changing to Hawarden Rangers Football Club, which now has over 200 junior members aged between 6 – 16, and over 50 senior members split between a First Team, Reserves Team and an Under 19s Team.

In 2019, there was also the creation of a Veterans Team, managed by club legend; Mark Evans.

The club joined the newly formed North East Wales Football League in 2020 as a Premier Division club. On 9 June 2022, it was announced that the club had been promoted to the tier 3 Ardal NW League for the 2022–23 season via the vacancy route..

Famous Past Players

Hawarden Rangers has a rich history of past players that have gone on to professional level, most notably;

 Barry Horne: Retired, ex-Everton F.C. defender who earned 59 caps for Wales.
 Ian Rush: Retired, former Liverpool F.C. and Wales striker who also had a stint as manager of Chester City.
 Michael Owen: Retired, previously of Liverpool F.C., Real Madrid, Newcastle, Manchester United & Stoke City. Attended Hawarden High School. Now commentates on BT Sport.
 Andy Dorman: Retired, enjoyed spells at FC Boston, New England Revolution, Scottish club St. Mirren and English side Crystal Palace. Attended Hawarden High School.
 Ian Edwards: Retired, previously of Crystal Palace, West Bromwich Albion, Chester City & Wrexham.
 David Brett: Retired, previously of Chester City & Colwyn Bay.
 Nick Henderson Retired, previously of Colwyn Bay, Cheshire Police, Nick is now the club vice-chairmen.

Hawarden Rangers Staff

Club Officials

First Team Management

Reserves Team Management

Development Team Management

Senior Teams - Honours

First Team
Clwyd League – President's Cup
Winners: 1987–88, 2004–05
Football Association of Wales – Fair Play Award
Winners: 2012–13, 2013–14, 2014–15
NWCFA Junior Cup
Winners: 1981–82
Welsh National League Division 1
Winners: 2019-20
Welsh National League Division 3 – Challenge Cup
Winners: 2006–07

First Team - Player Accolades

Reserves Team
North East Wales Football League - Reserves Division*
Winners: 2021 - 2022
North East Wales Football League - The Reserves Cup*
Runners Up: 2021 - 2022
Welsh National League Reserves Division – Challenge Cup
Winners: 2013–14 
Runners Up: 2014–15, 2018–19
Welsh National League Reserves Division – Fair Play Award
Winners: 2010–11, 2016–17

Reserves Team - Player Accolades

Veterans Team
Welsh National League - Veterans Championship Division
Winners: 2021-22
North East Wales Football Association - Veterans Cup
Winners: 2021-22

Development Team
Flintshire Youth League
Winners: 2021-22
Flintshire Youth League U19 – Challenge Cup
Runners Up: 2021-22

Youth Teams - Honours

Under 18
NEWFA Youth Cup
Winners: 1977–78, 1978–79, 1979–80, 1980–81, 1982–83, 1987–88, 1988–89, 1989–90, 1991–92
NWCFA Youth Challenge Cup
Winners: 1979–80, 1990–91

Junior Teams - Honours

Under 17
NWCFA Junior Challenge Cup
Winners: 1997–98

Under 16
Clwyd Junior League – Consolation Cup
Winners: 1994–95
Flintshire Junior League
Winners: 1987–88, 1988–89, 1996–97, 1997–98
Flintshire Junior League – Challenge Cup
Winners: 1995–96, 1997–98, 1999–00, 2004–05, 2017–18, 2018–19
NEWFA Junior Challenge Cup
Winners: 1987–88, 1997–98, 2018–19
NWCFA Junior Challenge Cup
Winners: 1990–91

Under 15
Flintshire Junior League
Winners: 1996–97, 2015–16
Flintshire Junior League – Challenge Cup
Winners: 1995–96, 1996–97, 1998–99, 2015–16
Flintshire Junior League – Fair Play Award
Winners: 2014–15
NEWFA Junior Challenge Cup
Winners: 2015–16
NWCFA Junior Challenge Cup
Winners: 1994–95, 1995–96

Under 14
Clwyd Junior League – Consolation Cup
Winners: 1994–95
Flintshire Junior League – Challenge Cup
Winners: 1990–91, 2010–11, 2018–19
Flintshire Junior League – Fair Play Award
Winners: 2014–15
NEWFA Junior Challenge Cup
Winners: 1990–91, 1996–97, 1999–00, 2016–17
NWCFA Junior Challenge Cup
Winners: 1993–94

Under 14 (Comets)
Flintshire Junior League – Fair Play Award
Winners: 2016–17

Under 14 (Hawks)
Flitshire Junior League
Winners: 2016–17
Flitshire Junior League – Challenge Cup
Winners: 2016–17

Under 13
Flintshire Junior League
Winners: 1995–96, 2008–09, 2018–19
Flintshire Junior League – Challenge Cup
Winners: 1996–97, 2003–04, 2018–19
Flintshire Junior League – Fair Play Award
Winners: 2017–18
NEWFA Junior Challenge Cup
Winners: 2015–16
NWCFA Junior Challenge Cup
Winners: 1994–95, 1998–99

Under 12
Clwyd Junior League – Consolation Cup
Winners: 1986–87, 1990–91
Flinshire Junior League – Challenge Cup
Winners: 1996–97, 1998–99, 2001–02, 2002–03, 2016–17, 2018–19
Flintshire Junior League – Division 1
Winners: 1988–89, 1992–93, 1994–95, 1996–97, 2007–08, 2016–17
Flintshire Junior League – Division 2
Winners: 1991–92, 1993–94
Flintshire Junior League – Fair Play Award
Winners: 2016–17
NEWFA Junior Challenge Cup
Winners: 2003–04, 2016–17
NWCFA Junior Challenge Cup
Winners: 1992–93

Under 12 (Hawks)
Flintshire Junior League
Winners: 2014–15
Flinshire Junior League – Challenge Cup
Winners: 2014–15

Under 11
Clwyd Junior League – Mini Tournament
Winners: 2002–03

Under 10
Clwyd Junior League
Winners: 1991–92
Clwyd Junior League – Challenge Cup
Winners: 1991–92
Clwyd Junior League – Mini Tournament
Winners: 1997–98, 1999–00, 2000–01

Under 9
Clwyd Junior League – Mini Tournament
Winners: 1995–96, 1996–97

Under 8
Clwyd Junior League – Mini Tournament
Winners: 2000–01, 2001–02

References

External links
 [./Http://www.hawardenrangersfc.com http://www.hawardenrangersfc.com] 
 https://www.facebook.com/hawardenrangersfc
 https://www.twitter.com/hawardenrangers

Football clubs in Wales
Welsh National League (Wrexham Area) Premier Division clubs
Sport in Wrexham County Borough
Association football clubs established in 1974
1974 establishments in Wales
North East Wales Football League clubs
Clwyd Football League clubs
Ardal Leagues clubs